Litany Para Pedir Posada is a song traditionally sung in The Posadas — traditional Christmas celebrations in some Spanish-speaking Latin American countries. In Mexico, posadas are part of what has recently been called The Guadalupe-Reyes Marathon.

Lyrics

Everyone:

Mexican folk songs
Spanish-language songs
Christmas music